La terrazza  is a 1980  Italian drama film directed by  Ettore Scola. The all-star cast features the best of Italian Cinema of its era: Marcello Mastroianni, Ugo Tognazzi, Vittorio Gassman, Jean-Louis Trintignant, Serge Reggiani, Stefano Satta Flores, Stefania Sandrelli, Carla Gravina, Ombretta Colli, Milena Vukotic.

The film director Ettore Scola and the screenwriter Agenore Incrocci make cameo appearances.

Plot
On a terrace in Rome, some old friends and colleagues, guests of a living room couple, periodically meet. The film focuses on the days following one of these encounters and recounts this time span in five different episodes from five different points of view.

The first episode tells of Enrico, an uninspired screenwriter who ends up in the throes of a very heavy nervous breakdown; the second episode tells of Luigi, an out-of-fashion pleasure-seeker womanizer journalist who tries to win back his youngest wife, a politically engaged journalist in claims feminists; the third episode tells of Sergio, an anorexic and very depressed Rai official; the fourth episode tells of Amedeo, a film producer of cassette films struggling with the artistic ambitions of his wife, who in fact endorses the career of a haughty director of scabrous arthouse films, and with which he no longer has any relationship in spite of himself; the last episode tells of Mario, a deputy of the Italian Communist Party, facing a strong existential crisis who finds himself cultivating an adulterous relationship.

At the end of these five stories, the film closes with a new meeting on that same terrace, which took place a year later.

Cast
 Marcello Mastroianni - Luigi
 Vittorio Gassman - Mario
 Ugo Tognazzi - Amedeo
 Jean-Louis Trintignant - Enrico
 Stefania Sandrelli - Giovanna
 Serge Reggiani - Sergio
 Carla Gravina - Carla
 Stefano Satta Flores - Tizzo
 Marie Trintignant - Isabella
 Ombretta Colli - Enza
 Galeazzo Benti - Galeazzo
 Milena Vukotic - Emanuela
 Agenore Incrocci - Vittorio
 Leonardo Benvenuti - A guest
 Ugo Gregoretti - Another guest
 Lucio Lombardo Radice - Himself

Awards
 2 awards at the 1980 Cannes Film Festival: Best Screenplay, Best Supporting Actress (Carla Gravina)
 2 Nastro d'Argento awards: Best Screenplay, Best Supporting Actress (Stefania Sandrelli)

References

External links 
 

1980 films
Italian drama films
1980s Italian-language films
1980 drama films
Films directed by Ettore Scola
Films set in Italy
Self-reflexive films
Films with screenplays by Age & Scarpelli
Films scored by Armando Trovajoli
Films with screenplays by Ettore Scola
1980s Italian films